Aidan Brady (1930 – 3 April 1993) was an Irish Gaelic footballer who played for club side Elphin and at inter-county level with the Roscommon senior football team. He was named on the "Roscommon team of the millennium".

Career

Born in Elphin, County Roscommon, Brady first came to Gaelic football prominence at Summerhill College in Sligo, where he was also selected for the Connacht colleges team. A minor with Roscommon in 1948 and a junior in 1951, he was reserve goalkeeper to Gerry Dolan for the 1951 Connacht Championship before taking over as first-choice 'keeper the following year. The following decade saw Brady win four Connacht Championship titles, while he also ended up on the losing side in the 1962 All-Ireland final. He lined out at full-back for the Elphin club, winning five County Championship titles, while his inclusion on the Connacht team saw him claim two Railway Cup medals. Brady was named on a special Football Team of the Century made up of players who never won an All-Ireland medal and was posthumously named on the Roscommon Football Team of the Millennium.

Personal life and death

Brady spent over 25 years as Director of the National Botanic Gardens in Glasnevin. He died after a brief illness at the Bon Secours Hospital on 3 April 1993.

Honours

Elphin
Roscommon Senior Football Championship: 1950, 1951, 1955, 1956, 1957

Roscommon
Connacht Senior Football Championship: 1952, 1953, 1961, 1962

Connacht
Railway Cup:1957, 1958

References

1930 births
1993 deaths
Connacht inter-provincial Gaelic footballers
Gaelic football goalkeepers
Roscommon inter-county Gaelic footballers